Washington Street School may refer to 

Washington Street School (Hartford, Connecticut), listed on the National Register of Historic Places in Hartford, Connecticut
Washington Street School (Franklin Square, New York)